Jean-Louis de Biasi is a published author, lecturer, and spiritual teacher.

Career
De Biasi was born in Castillonnès (France) in 1959. He holds a master's degree in philosophy (University of Bordeaux). The title of his thesis was "Morals and Religion in the work of Nietzsche". He taught philosophy in France as a teacher for over 15 years, and also successfully graduated in Hebrew. He has been trained in Gestalt therapy with certification from the Institut Francais de Gestalt-Therapie (French Institute of Gestalt Therapy). For several years, he also practiced oneirology and hypnotherapy. From the 70's to the 90's he practiced intensively Hatha Yoga (that he learnt with Doctor F. Sanfilippo), pranayama, yoga nidra (a kind of relaxation associated with visualization), creative visualization along with the development of astral perception. He began to teach these sciences and was invited to several radio shows on these subjects. Hypnotism was also part of his initial training of this time. Deepening his practice, he spent time to master creative visualization.

He is a specialist in Ancient Mediterranean religions, classical philosophy, Freemasonry, and rituals in the Western Tradition. Various initiatory degrees, considered some of the highest in Western Esotericism, have been conferred upon him. With regard to Freemasonry, he is a Master Mason and Past Master belonging at present to the Grand Lodge F.A.A.M. of the State of Nevada (U.S.A.). He also received the 32° of the American Scottish Rite in Washington, D.C., and was initiated into Royal Arch Masonry in Canada.

During the time he lived in France and prior to joining American Freemasonry, the entirety of the Egyptian Freemasonry degrees (33°-95°) as well as other related degrees were received by him. Beginning in 1999 and over the course of the next few years, he reawakened, founded, and organized within the Grand Orient de France (the largest Masonic organization in France) the Egyptian system of Memphis-Misraim according to the American degrees organized by John Yarker. It was also during 1999 that the Grand Orient de France asked him to create a scientific publication which was called Arcana. He was nominated Grand Chancellor in 2002 and Grand Orator in 2003.

In 1997, Jean-Louis de Biasi founded La Parole Circule (Spread the Word), the first-ever online magazine of international scope devoted to Freemasonry and restricted to Freemasons. This magazine was published until 2008. He was also one of the founders of the online community of Fraternelle des Internautes Francophones, the first French Masonic one to be established.

in 1987, he came in contact with an international organization called the “Aurum Solis - Mediterranean Yoga." He was received in this organization, followed its entire path, and became the lifetime head (Grand Master) of this organization in 2003.

The Aurum Solis “Gold of the Sun” is a Mediterranean tradition that was first revealed to the public in 1897 and has been in continual operation since.

Its heritage encompasses the greatest teachings and practices of the Western pre-Christian world. This traditional school is often called the “Yoga of the West” and we lovingly refer to it as “Mediterranean Yoga”. The eight rays of the Glorious Star constitute its whole system. 

As a published author, Jean-Louis de Biasi has written in French about the fields of Freemasonry, ancient religions, and rituals. He was published by Grancher Publications (Editions Grancher). His writings in English have been and continue to be published by Llewellyn Publications. Several of his books have been translated into various languages such as French, Portuguese, Spanish, Russian, and Dutch.

As a published author, he is a member of the National Writers Union

With Patricia, his wife, he is managing the “Aurum Solis - Mediterranean Yoga" and writings new books that are published by Llewellyn Publications.

Published works

Books

Excerpts from his bibliography (books and their foreign editions):
 ABC de l'Aura (ABC of the Aura), Grancher, Paris, 1997 & 2000.
 Le martinisme (Martinism), Sepp, Paris, 1997. (Spanish Edition: Manakel Publications, Madrid, SP.)
 Les rites maçonniques égyptiens en franc-maçonnerie (The Egyptian Rituals in Freemasonry), Edimaf, Paris, 2001.
 ABC de magie naturelle (ABC of Natural Magic), Grancher, Paris, 2000.
 L'énergie du Tarot (The Energy of the Tarot), Grancher, Paris, 2004.
 ABC de spiritualité maçonnique (ABC of Freemasonic Spirituality), Grancher, Paris, 2006.
 ABC de kabbale chrétienne (ABC of Christian Kabbalah), Grancher, Paris, 2008. (Portuguese Edition: Madras Publications, Brazil)
 ABC de l'ésotérisme maçonnique (ABC of Esoteric Freemasonry), Grancher, Paris, 2009.
 ABC de la Magie sacrée (ABC of Sacred Magic), Grancher, Paris, 2010. (Portuguese Edition: Academia Platonica, Las Vegas.)
 Secrets and Practices of the Freemasons, Llewellyn Publications, Woodbury, MN, 2010. (Portuguese Editions: Europa-America Publications, Portugal & Agora Hermetica Publications, Fortaleza, BR, 2012. Dutch Edition: AnkhHermes Publications, Utrecht, 2012.)
 The Divine Arcana of the Aurum Solis, Llewellyn Publications, Woodbury, MN, 2011. (Portuguese Edition: Agora Hermetica Publications, Fortaleza, BR, 2012.)
 Livres sacrés hermétistes (The Hermetic Sacred Books), Academia Platonica Publications, Las Vegas, 2012. Currently published by Theurgia.
 Luz sobre a Iniciaçao (Light upon Initiation), Madras Publications, São Paulo, BR, 2012.
 Harmonizaçoes astrologicas (Astrologic Harmonizations), Agora Hermetica Publications, Fortaleza, BR, 2012.
 Rediscover the Magick of the Gods and Goddesses, Llewellyn Publications, Woodbury, MN, 2014.
 The Magical Use of Prayer Beads, Llewellyn Publications, Woodbury, MN, 2016.
 Hidden Mandala Coloring Book, Llewellyn Publications, Woodbury, MN, 2017.
Esoteric Freemasonry, Llewellyn Publications, Woodbury, MN, 2018.
Mysteries of the Aura, Llewellyn Publications, Woodbury, MN, (Forthcoming).

CDs
 Initiation à la relaxation (Relaxation), Academia Platonica, 2004. Currently published by Theurgia.
 Cagliostro et l’oracle de la colombe (Cagliostro), Academia Platonica, 2004. Currently published by Theurgia.
 Enochian Sounds, Academia Platonica, 2005. Currently published by Theurgia.
 Les rites maçonniques (Masonic Rituals), Academia Platonica, 2005. Currently published by Theurgia.
 L'Ordre Kabbalistique de la Rose-Croix et l'hermétisme (Hermetism and the Rose-Cross), Academia Platonica, 2006. Currently published by Theurgia.
 Cours de Tarot (Tarot Courses), Academia Platonica, 2010. Currently published by Theurgia.

Art
 The Aurum Solis Tarot Deck and Booklet, Academia Platonica, 2011. Currently published by Theurgia.

References

External links
 National Writers Union

French Freemasons
French occultists
French occult writers
Hermeticists
Living people
1959 births
20th-century occultists
21st-century occultists
20th-century French philosophers
21st-century French philosophers